The Hong Kong International Airport Automated People Mover is a driverless people mover located within Hong Kong International Airport. It operates in two segments within Terminal 1 and the Midfield Concourse, and between Terminals 1, Terminals 2, and also connects to the Skypier.

Setup

The first segment runs between the East Hall and the West Hall in Terminal 1. The segment aims to provide a faster and easier way for passengers travelling between immigration and boarding gates at the far end of the Terminal. Westbound service is for departure passengers only, while eastbound service is for arrival passengers only.  Passengers are not allowed to take the APM back to the East Hall, where most shops are located. For eastbound service, after reaching the East Hall, all arrival passengers must disembark for immigration, customs, and baggage claim. They are not allowed to take the APM back to the West Hall. Since both the East Hall and the West Hall are located within Terminal 1, passengers can choose to instead use travellators or walk, though this will be more time-consuming.

The second segment of the system runs from the SkyPier to Terminal 2 and then continues to the East Hall of Terminal 1. Different from the first segment, the second segment is the only means by which these three places are connected. SkyPier passengers heading for departing flights must take the westbound service of this segment to the East Hall of Terminal 1. SkyPier passengers are not allowed to alight at Terminal 2. Departure passengers from Terminal 2 can join the westbound service of the second segment from Terminal 2. All passengers must leave the train when it arrives at the East Hall of Terminal 1. Depending on the boarding gate location of their onward flight, passengers can choose to change to the first segment of APM system at the opposite platform of the East Hall, to continue their way to the West Hall, or simply approach the boarding gate directly from the East Hall. The eastbound service is only for arrival passengers heading to SkyPier for ferry service to PRD ports. Ferry tickets will be checked before passengers may board the APM. Once arriving at the SkyPier, passengers are not allowed to travel back to Terminal 1. Since there is no eastbound platform in Terminal 2, there is no intermediate station for the eastbound service.

The section from the East Hall to SkyPier is for SkyPier passengers and staff only. The first segment began operations in 1998, while the second segment began operations in early 2007. The SkyPier extension was opened to the public in late 2009. 

In Late 2015, the Midfield Concourse extension was opened when the Midfield Concourse started operation.

Facts
 Section Length:
From Terminal 1 East Hall to Terminal 1 West Hall: 750m 
From Terminal 2 to Terminal 1 East Hall: 430m (Only one-way journey is offered from T2 to the East Hall)
From Skypier to Terminal 2: 600m (Estimated figures only)
From Midfield Concourse to Terminal 1 West Hall: 1000m (Estimated figures only)
 Stations: 5 (Gates 201-230, Gates 40-80, Gates 1-36 of Terminal 1, Terminal 2, and SkyPier)
 Rolling Stock:
Mitsubishi Heavy Industries Crystal Mover, 4 cars (phase 1 stock)
vehicle by Ishikawajima-Harima Heavy Industries, 4 cars (phase 2 stock)
 Manufacturer:
Mitsubishi Heavy Industries of Japan (phase 1 stock)
Ishikawajima-Harima Heavy Industries of Japan (phase 2 stock)
 Speed: 62 km/h
 Capacity: 152 passengers

Expansion

Terminal 2 Concourse 
The People Mover will be extended to the Terminal 2 Concourse in the 3rd Runway Development. It is estimated to open in 2024.

Maintenance 
The APM system is maintained by MTR Corporation.

References

APM
APM
Hong Kong Airport People Mover

External links

 Airport Authority SkyCity Brochure

Rail transport in Hong Kong
Chek Lap Kok
Airport people mover systems
Crystal Mover people movers
Hong Kong International Airport
People mover systems in China
1998 establishments in Hong Kong